Dansk Designs (also known as Dansk International Designs starting in 1954) is an American distributor and retailer of cookware, tableware, and other home accessories based in Mount Kisco, New York. , the brand is called Dansk and is a wholly owned subsidiary of Lenox Corporation with headquarters located in Bristol, Pennsylvania.

As of 2021, the brand Dansk was acquired by Food52.

History
On a trip to Europe in 1954, Americans Martha and Ted Nierenberg went in search of a product to manufacture and produce for a U.S. audience. During a visit to the Museum of Arts and Crafts Kunstindustrimuseet (today the Danish Museum of Art & Design Designmuseum Danmark) in Copenhagen, they saw a unique set of cutlery on display that combined teak and stainless steel, created by artist-designer Jens Quistgaard. The Nierenbergs tracked down Quistgaard and spoke with him in an effort to convince him to manufacture the cutlery. At first, Quistgaard insisted that the pieces could only be forged by hand, one piece at a time, but Nierenberg was able to convince him they could be mass-produced, leading to Dansk Designs' first product, Fjord flatware, which has been one of the brand's enduring bestsellers.

The Nierenbergs established Dansk that year in the garage of their Great Neck, New York, home, with Quistgaard as its founding designer. The name is the Danish word for Danish. By the end of 1954, Ted Nierenberg attracted orders for several hundred units from stores all around the United States, and the business took off from there. By 1958, Nierenberg and Quistgaard had expanded Dansk's wares to include teak magazine racks and stools, stoneware casseroles, salt and pepper grinders, and flatware with split cane handles. The New York Times credited Dansk with "creating a stir" with "some of the most popular accessories found in American homes." As the company name suggested, Dansk came to epitomize Danish modern design in the urban American market. By 1982, Quistgaard had created more than 2,000 different designs for Dansk of dinnerware, glassware and items for the home.

Dansk relocated its headquarters to Mount Kisco, New York, in the 1960s.

Dansk was purchased in June 1985 by Dansk Acquisition Corp. in a deal initiated by Goldman Sachs.

Dansk was acquired in 1991 by the Brown-Forman Corporation and incorporated together under its Lenox subsidiary. On March 16, 2009, a group of investors led by Clarion Capital Partners LLC purchased the assets of Lenox—including Dansk—and renamed the company Lenox Corporation. As of January 2018, Dansk continues as a brand of Lenox. Dansk designs are recognised for their artistic merit and several examples are held in the collection of the Metropolitan Museum of Art.

In May 2021, Food52, the content-to-commerce platform founded by Amanda Hesser, purchased Dansk from Center Lane Partners with plans to revive the brand.

References

External links
Official site
Dansk collection in the Cooper-Hewitt, National Design Museum

Companies based in Westchester County, New York
Retail companies established in 1954
Home decor retailers
1954 establishments in New York (state)
Cutlery brands